Martina Trevisan was the defending champion, but lost in the first round to Anastasia Grymalska. 

Sílvia Soler Espinosa won the title, defeating Laura Pous Tió in an all-Spanish final, 2–6, 6–4, 7–5.

Seeds

Main draw

Finals

Top half

Bottom half

References 
 Main draw

Torneo Internazionale Femminile Antico Tiro a Volo - Singles